The 2015–16 Women's National League was the fifth season of the Women's National League. Two new clubs joined the league before the start of the season, restoring the number of teams in the league to eight. Kilkenny United were formed as expansion team  while Raheny United's senior women's team merged with Shelbourne Ladies. This effectively saw Shelbourne Ladies takeover Raheny United's place in the WNL. The season also saw the introduction of the WNL Shield. Wexford Youths and Shelbourne Ladies finished the season as the league's two strongest teams. In the league itself, the two teams finished level on points before Wexford Youths retained the title after a play-off. Wexford Youths also completed a treble, having already won both the FAI Women's Cup and WNL Shield. Shelbourne Ladies were also runners up in the WNL Shield before going onto win the WNL Cup. Before the season was finished Castlebar Celtic withdrew because they were unable to field a team.

WNL Shield

The season began with the inaugural WNL Shield which saw the eight teams divided into two regional groups, one featuring northern teams and another featuring mostly southern teams. UCD Waves played in Group A along with the southern teams, Cork City, Kilkenny United and Wexford Youths. The other four northern teams, Castlebar Celtic, Galway W.F.C., Peamount United and Shelbourne Ladies played in Group B. The group stages began on 5 September and were completed by 4 October, before the regular season began. The format saw the four teams play each other once with the two group winners meeting in the final. In a sign of things to come, Castlebar Celtic failed to field a team against Shelbourne Ladies in their group game. Wexford Youths booked their place in the final with a 5–0 victory over Cork City. In the final, played at Ferrycarrig Park on 30 March 2016, Wexford Youths defeated Shelbourne Ladies 1–0 with Edel Kennedy scoring the winner.

Group A

Group B

Final

Notes

Regular season
The regular season began in late October 2015 and was completed by May 2016. It used the traditional round-robin format with each team playing two full rounds of games home and away. Before the season was finished Castlebar Celtic withdrew because they were unable to field a team. Celtic had played nine games, losing eight and winning just one. All their results were subsequently expunged. During the course of the regular season Celtic had suffered two heavy defeats. On 10 October 2015 they lost 9–1 at home to Shelbourne Ladies. Then on 2 January 2016 they lost 17–1 to Wexford Youths. As a result of storms and floods, the season saw several games called off. This resulted in a backlog of games during the final run in. Some of these games were played midweek. In the final week Wexford Youths travelled to Galway W.F.C. on Sunday, 8 May knowing a victory would secure them the league title. However Youths dropped their first league points away from home and could only manage a 1–1 draw. Youths had a second chance to clinch the title when they played Shelbourne Ladies at Tolka Park on Wednesday, 11 May. However Shelbourne Ladies won 3–1 and as result finished level on points with Youths. This meant the title would be decided by a play-off for the first time. Before the play-off Shelbourne Ladies defeated UCD Waves in the WNL Cup final on Sunday, 15 May.  The play-off took place on Sunday, 22 May at Tallaght Stadium. It proved third time lucky for Wexford Youths as they finally secured the title with a 2–1 win.

Final table

Results

Play-off

WNL Cup
The WNL Cup was played between January and May 2016 during the second half of the season. The cup used a similar format to the WNL Shield, using the same regional groups. The WNL Cup fixtures were effectively the return matches of the earlier WNL Shield fixtures. The top two teams from each group progressed to the semi-finals. In the final Shelbourne Ladies defeated UCD Waves 3–2 at Richmond Park on 1 May 2016.

Group A

Group B

Semi-finals

Final

WNL Awards
Senior Player of the Year
 Karen Duggan (UCD Waves)
Young Player of the Year
 Roma McLaughlin (Peamount United)
Irish Daily Mail Golden Boot
 Áine O'Gorman (UCD Waves)
Team of the Season

References

Women's National League (Ireland) seasons
Ireland
Women
Women
1